Club Guaraní Antonio Franco is an Argentine football club from the city of Posadas, Misiones. The team currently plays in Primera B Nacional, the second major league in Argentine Football league system.

The club played at the highest level of Argentine football on 4 occasions. Guaraní A. Franco competed in the National tournaments of 1971, 1981, 1982 and 1985. Guaraní was eliminated in the first round group stage in all four attempts. In 2011–12 the club won the Torneo Argentino B championship promoting to the upper division, Torneo Argentino A where it currently plays.

Players

Current roster

External links

Official website

Football clubs in Misiones Province
Association football clubs established in 1932
1932 establishments in Argentina